The 2002–03 Kansas Jayhawks men's basketball team represented the University of Kansas in the 2002–03 NCAA Division I men's basketball season, which was the Jayhawks' 105th basketball season and the 15th and final season under head coach Roy Williams. The team played its home games in Allen Fieldhouse in Lawrence, Kansas.

Recruiting 

|}

Roster

Schedule

|-
!colspan=9 style=| Exhibition

|-
!colspan=9 style=|Regular season 

|-
!colspan=9 style=|Big 12 Tournament

|-
!colspan=9 style=|NCAA tournament

Rankings

*There was no coaches poll in week 1.

See also
 2003 NCAA Division I men's basketball tournament
 2003 Big 12 men's basketball tournament
 2002-03 NCAA Division I men's basketball season
 2002–03 NCAA Division I men's basketball rankings

References 

Kansas Jayhawks men's basketball seasons
Kansas
NCAA Division I men's basketball tournament Final Four seasons
Kansas Jayhawks men's basketball
Kansas Jayhawks men's basketball
Kansas